Austin Sopp (born August 26, 1994), better known by the ring name Austin Gunn, is an American professional wrestler and reality television personality, currently signed with All Elite Wrestling (AEW) where he is part of a tag team with his brother, Colten as The Gunns, where they are the current AEW World Tag Team Champions in their first reign. Gunn is a second-generation professional wrestler, as he is a son of professional wrestler Billy Gunn.

Early life and education 
Sopp was born on August 26, 1994, in Orlando, Florida. He is a son of professional wrestler Billy Gunn and Tina Tinnell Sopp  and the brother of professional wrestler Colten Gunn. Sopp attended Rollins College in Winter Park, Florida, from 2013 to 2017. He was a member of the Lacrosse Team and graduated with a degree in elementary education.

Professional wrestling career

Ring of Honor (2019) 
In June 2019, Gunn confirmed that he had signed a contract with Ring of Honor (ROH). He made his ROH debut on August 26, 2019, in a dark match as part of the ROH Top Prospect Tournament, defeating Brian Johnson in the quarterfinals and Dante Caballero in the semifinals. On September 28, 2019, Gunn was defeated by Dak Draper in the finals of the Top Prospect Tournament.

All Elite Wrestling (2020–present) 
On January 9, 2020, it was announced that Gunn had officially signed with All Elite Wrestling.

On January 14, 2020, Gunn made his AEW debut in a tag team match on AEW Dark teaming with his father Billy Gunn as The Gunn Club defeating the team of Peter Avalon and Shawn Spears. Gunn suffered a torn PCL injury during the match. On November 4, 2020, Gunn (who had previously been involved with his father in tag team matches on Dark) officially made his  debut on AEW Dynamite, teaming with his father and Cody Rhodes to defeat Dark Order members 10, John Silver and Colt Cabana. 
On the November 17, 2020 episode of Dark, Austin's brother Colten, now wrestling as a fellow Gunn Club member, would team with Austin and their father in a match which saw the Gunn Club defeat BSHP King, Joey O’Riley and Sean Maluta by pinfall in a six-man tag team match. The three man Gunn Club would then defeat Cezar Bononi, KTB, and Seth Gargis in another six man tag team match on the November 24, 2020 episode of Dark.  On the December 8, 2020 episode of Dark The three man Gunn Club-which entered the ring on a golf cart with the words "Taz Taxi" on the side, defeated Shawn Dean, Sean Maluta & RYZIN. On February 9, 2022 (during a match that aired two days later on AEW Rampage), Austin and Colten Gunn wrestled for the AEW Tag Championship, losing to reigning champions Jurassic Express (Jungle Boy and Luchasaurus). On the April 15, 2022 episode of AEW Rampage, the Gunn Club lost a six-man tag team match to Blackpool Combat Club.

Somewhat outside of AEW, in November 2021 Ring of Honor wrestler Danhausen began a Twitter feud with the Gunn Club, referring to Colten and Austin as "Ass Boys", in reference to Billy Gunn's infamous "Mr. Ass" gimmick in the Attitude Era. While Billy Gunn himself initially had no comment, the rest of Gunn Club despised the nickname after fans began chanting "Ass Boys" during their matches. Billy Gunn finally commented when he surprised his sons by wearing an "Ass Boys" shirt, encouraging them to "embrace the assness" and even started teasing mooning the crowd again. 

On the February 8, 2023, episode of Dynamite, The Gunns would win their first AEW World Tag Team Championship from The Acclaimed.

Other media 
On December 6, 2021, it was announced that Gunn would appear on the E! reality television series Relatively Famous: Ranch Rules, which aired in early 2022.

Championships and accomplishments 
All Elite Wrestling
AEW World Tag Team Championship (1 time, current) - with Colten Gunn
New South Wrestling
New South Tag Team Championship (1 time) – with Colten Gunn

References

External links 

1994 births
AEW World Tag Team Champions
All Elite Wrestling personnel
American male professional wrestlers
Living people
Professional wrestlers from Florida
Rollins College alumni
Sportspeople from Orlando, Florida
Participants in American reality television series
American male rappers
21st-century professional wrestlers